Pam Rhodes is an English television, radio presenter and author, known for presenting BBC Television's long-running religious series Songs of Praise since the early 1980s.

Early life
Rhodes grew up in Gosport and attended Gosport County Grammar School. Her first job in television was in 1969 as programme secretary for Thames TV's Today which was hosted by Eamonn Andrews, going on to become programme organiser for the ITV network documentary series This Week.

Career

In January 2015, Rhodese presented the "Songs of Dre's" feature on BBC Radio 2's "Dermot O'Leary Show".

Rhodes wrote five novels: With Hearts and Hymns and Voices (Lion Hudson); The Trespassers, Whispers, Ties That Bind and Letting Go (all for Hodder and Stoughton Publishers); Coming Through (Macmillan Publishing); Colours for the Soul, As Time Goes By and Love Bites (all quotation books for Lion Hudson) and Hear My Song (SPCK Publishing).

In 2020, Rhodes received the Thomas Cranmer Award for Worship from Justin Welby, Archbishop of Canterbury, "for her outstanding work in hosting Songs of Praise on the BBC for over 30 years."

Personal life
Rhodes and her husband, Richard Crow, own and run Biggleswade Cat Lodge, a boarding cattery in Biggleswade in Bedfordshire, which also boards and re-homes RSPCA cats. She is a vice-president of the Church Army; patron of Livability and Methodist Homes for the Aged (the MHA Group); and an ambassador for Keech Hospice Care based in Great Bramingham Lane, Luton. She was made an honorary member of the Royal School of Church Music in 2009 and was awarded an honorary doctorate of arts for her contribution to news journalism and charity work by the University of Bedfordshire in 2010.

References

External links 
Official website
BBC Biography

Living people
English television presenters
English Christians
English religious writers
English non-fiction writers
English women novelists
People from Gillingham, Kent
Women religious writers
Church Army people
English women non-fiction writers
Year of birth missing (living people)